Patal may refer to:
 Patal, Fars
 Patal, Hormozgan
 Patal-e Isin, Hormozgan

See also
 Patel, a surname